DMACA  may refer to:
 DMACA reagent or p-dimethylaminocinnamaldehyde, a dye used to detect proanthocyanidins polyphenolic compounds in plants
 DMACA crystal (or [NH2(CH3)2]3Sb2Cl9), a crystal showing ferroelectric phase transition studied in vibrational spectroscopy
 7-dimethylaminocoumarin-4-acetic acid (C13H13NO4, molar mass : 247.25 g/mol, CAS number : 80883-54-1),

References